The 1962 New Mexico Lobos football team represented the University of New Mexico in the Western Athletic Conference (WAC) during the 1962 NCAA University Division football season.  In their third season under head coach Bill Weeks, the Lobos compiled a 7–2–1 record (2–1–1 against WAC opponents), won the WAC championship, and outscored opponents, 210 to 159.

The team's statistical leaders included Jim Cromartie with 245 passing yards, Bobby Santiago with 806 rushing yards and 60 points scored, and George Heard with 255 receiving yards.

Schedule

References

New Mexico
New Mexico Lobos football seasons
Western Athletic Conference football champion seasons
New Mexico Lobos football